San Diego Polo Club is a polo club in situated Rancho Santa Fe in San Diego, California. The club was founded in 1986. The San Diego Polo Club has one of the longest playing seasons in the country, offering polo from May- November, 5 world-class polo fields, exercise track, stables for more than 400 horses, an indoor arena and thriving polo school.
The 2011 summer season open to the public runs June 12- October 2. Polo lessons are offered May- November.

In the off season, the fields are used by lacrosse and soccer teams.

References

Polo clubs in the United States
Polo club